Nightingale Hall Rice Mill Chimney, also known as Nightingale Plantation, is a historic rice mill chimney located near Georgetown, Georgetown County, South Carolina. This rice mill chimney is significant as one of seven known extant rice mill chimneys in Georgetown County.  It is associated with Nightingale Hall, one of several productive plantations on the Pee Dee River. The chimney is approximately 29 feet high, and 6 feet square at the base.

It was listed on the National Register of Historic Places in 1988.

References

Agricultural buildings and structures on the National Register of Historic Places in South Carolina
Buildings and structures completed in 1846
National Register of Historic Places in Georgetown County, South Carolina
Buildings and structures in Georgetown County, South Carolina
Chimneys in the United States